Guardians is the ninth studio album by American metalcore band August Burns Red. It was released on April 3, 2020, through Fearless Records. The album was produced by Carson Slovak and Grant McFarland. It is their last album to be released on this label before the band signed to SharpTone Records in 2022.

Release and promotion
On February 6, 2020, August Burns Red released the first single, "Defender". At the same time, the band announced the album itself, the album cover, the track list, and release date. On February 26, the band released the second single of the album titled "Bones". On March 26, a week before the album release, the band released their third single "Paramount".

After the release of the album on April 3, the band planned to embark on a full North American Tour in support of Killswitch Engage; however, the tour was delayed due to the COVID-19 pandemic.

Critical reception

The album received positive reviews from critics. AllMusic gave the album a positive review saying, "August Burns Red's particular brand of metalcore, one that favors melody and positivity over atonal angst, hasn't changed much over time -- the metalcore genre itself is as calculated as it is explosive -- but Guardians delivers 11 good-to-great reasons why that formula has worked for so long." Carlos Zelaya from Dead Press! rated the album positively calling it: "Guardians is all-in-all a solid album that will undoubtedly satisfy August Burns Red fans. It's hard to guess whether you'd get much out of it if you're not already sold by what they've delivered thus far in their career, or indeed of some of their contemporaries, but when it comes to this type of music, you could certainly do a lot worse." Distorted Sound scored the album 7 out of 10 and said: "There's little doubt that many jumping into Guardians won't be doing so in the hope that AUGUST BURNS RED are about to reinvent themselves. Nine records in, the Pennsylvanians blueprint is nigh-on set in stone by this point, and Guardians reinforces the idea that there's little wrong with this. Will AUGUST BURNS RED write a similar sounding record in two years time? Probably, but the band have done an excellent job at making that kind of statement a compliment rather than a criticism. Guardians is another notch on the belt of arguably one of modern metal's most consistent, reliable bands." Addison Herron-Wheeler of Exclaim! gave it 8 out of 10 and said: "While this record may not necessarily break new ground in the sense that it sounds like something we've never heard before, they definitely showed that they are still more than capable of making a solid record and keeping fans happy."

Kerrang! gave the album 4 out of 5 and stated: "Even with metalcore in its current era of hyper-innovative flux – every band and their dog experimenting with synths, samples and strange new sounds in a race to the genre's next evolutionary step – there's still something to be said for good old meat-and-potatoes melodic munch. 17 years in, Pennsylvania bruisers August Burns Red remain some of its highest-quality purveyors." Hunter Hewgley from KillYourStereo gave the album 85 out of 100 and said: "Guardians feels like an album that was written for any longtime lover of August Burns Red. There is truly something for everyone on their seventh record, pulling influences from every previous era of the metalcore band's history. In any other circumstance, I'd say that this was pandering and a cynical cash-grab, but no, it honestly feels as if August Burns Red is really enjoying writing music like this. You can hear the sheer passion and drive behind each song and every note played, and Jake Luhrs' energetic vocal delivery is the real icing on the cake. This is the album that many people, the band included, have been waiting on for years. As someone who had slightly fallen off of the August Burns Red bandwagon of late, I am over the moon to say that Guardians was a great reminder as to why this band is so wildly popular, and why I still love them as much as I do. I'm back on the wagon now!" New Transcendence praised the album saying, "Overall, Guardians is a righteous testament to diversity within metalcore. It boasts heaviness, catchiness, bounce, emotion, groove—you name it, it's there—but it simply lacks the staying power that made Phantom Anthem such an outstanding record. While August Burns Red's 2020 release isn't a whole step backwards, it fails to continue the incredible trajectory and, in many ways, halts the band's momentum, feeling like a record that—with just a little more refinement—could have been another star-studded entry in the band's ever-evolving discography." Wall of Sound scored the album 8/10 saying: "August Burns Red seem to deliver outstanding records, one after the other. If you're not yet a fan, it is never too late to experience what you have been missing out on and join the party."

Track listing

Personnel
August Burns Red
 Jake Luhrs – lead vocals
 JB Brubaker – lead guitar
 Brent Rambler – rhythm guitar
 Dustin Davidson – bass guitar, backing vocals
 Matt Greiner – drums, piano

Additional personnel
 Carson Slovak – producer
 Grant McFarland – producer

Charts

See also
 List of 2020 albums

References

2020 albums
August Burns Red albums
Fearless Records albums